Admiral Henry Dennis Hickley (11 December 1826 – 22 December 1903) was a Royal Navy officer who became Senior Officer, Coast of Ireland Station.

Naval career
Hickley became commanding officer of the armoured ram HMS Hotspur in May 1872, commanding officer of the battleship HMS Audacious in September 1873 and commanding officer of the Central battery ship HMS Iron Duke in August 1875. He went on to be Captain of the training ship HMS Impregnable in January 1878 and Senior Officer, Coast of Ireland Station in March 1885 before he retired in December 1886.

References

1826 births
1903 deaths
Royal Navy admirals